Miss Bosne i Hercegovine (Miss Bosnia and Herzegovina) is a national Beauty pageant in Bosnia and Herzegovina.

History
The Miss BiH Organization dedicates to be national preliminary to Miss World since 1996 in under Zdravko Zubak directorship. The main result of Miss BiH is Beauty With A Purpose. The winner is automatically doing project before attending Miss World competition.

Titleholders
Color key

References

External links
Miss BiH Official website
Miss BiH

Bosnia and Herzegovina
Beauty pageants in Bosnia and Herzegovina
Recurring events established in 1996
1996 establishments in Bosnia and Herzegovina
Bosnia and Herzegovina awards